Fallaxdesmis is a genus of beetle in the family Cerambycidae. It was described by Santos-Silva & Wappes in 2018 and contains the single species; Fallaxdesmis unicolor.

References

Desmiphorini